Radio Mix is a Bosnian commercial radio station, broadcasting from Sarajevo.

History and programming
Radio Mix was founded on 18 May 2016 when RSG Group bought the frequency from Radio Vrhbosna. Radio Mix is formatted as a variety radio service that broadcasts greatest pop and folk hits, talk shows and short news.

The program is currently broadcast at one frequency (Sarajevo ), estimated number of potential listeners is around 426,581. Radio Mix is part of the informal media group in the radio market of Bosnia and Herzegovina called RSG Group.

Frequencies
The program is currently broadcast on 7 frequencies:

 Sarajevo 
 Travnik 
 Zenica 
 Tešanj 
 Mostar 
 Tuzla 
 Konjic

See also 
List of radio stations in Bosnia and Herzegovina

References

External links 
 
 Communications Regulatory Agency of Bosnia and Herzegovina
 Radio Mix in Facebook

Sarajevo
Radio stations established in 2016
Mass media in Sarajevo